Óscar Fornés López (born 2 March 1983) is a Spanish footballer who plays for Callosa Deportiva CF as a goalkeeper.

Club career
Born in Benicarló, Province of Castellón, Valencian Community, Fornés finished his youth career with local club Villarreal CF, and made his senior debut with amateurs UD San Mateo in the 2002–03 season. The following year, he joined CD Castellón B.

In the summer of 2004, Fornés signed with Elche CF, being initially assigned to the reserves in the Tercera División. On 17 June 2006 he played his only professional match, starting in a 2–2 Segunda División away draw against Real Valladolid.

Fornés competed in the Segunda División B but also in the fourth tier the following years, representing Villajoyosa CF, CF Gavà, Caravaca CF, Benidorm CF, CD Teruel and UE Olot. With the latter side, he achieved promotion to division three in 2013, appearing in 28 games and conceding only 21 goals during the campaign.

References

External links

1983 births
Living people
Spanish footballers
Footballers from the Valencian Community
Association football goalkeepers
Segunda División players
Segunda División B players
Tercera División players
Tercera Federación players
Divisiones Regionales de Fútbol players
Elche CF Ilicitano footballers
Elche CF players
Villajoyosa CF footballers
CF Gavà players
Caravaca CF players
Benidorm CF footballers
CD Teruel footballers
UE Olot players
CD Torrevieja players
Crevillente Deportivo players
CF La Nucía players
Orihuela CF players